Maurice Borno (1917–1955) was a Haitian painter. Born in Port-au-Prince, Borno attended school in Haiti, New York City, and Paris. He was a founding member of the Centre d'Art and is considered a pioneer of Haitian art.

References
 

1917 births
1955 deaths
20th-century Haitian painters
20th-century Haitian male artists
Haitian male painters
Haitian expatriates in the United States
Haitian expatriates in France